Left and right or left–right may refer to:

 Left and right body relative directions in terms of an observer (as in turn right, the player to your left)
 Left and right as designating different chiralities, independent of an observer (as in left glove, left-eyed flatfish, left-handed screw threads)
 Left- and right-handedness
 Left- and right-laterality
 Left- and right-ocular dominance
 Left–right political spectrum

Left and right or Left Right may also refer to:

Mathematics 
 Left and right (algebra)
 Orientation (geometry)
 One-sided limits in calculus and other derived meanings

Arts 
 Left & Right (album), a 1968 album by Rahsaan Roland Kirk
 "Left & Right" (D'Angelo song), 2000
"Left and Right" (Seventeen song), 2020
"Left and Right" (Charlie Puth song), 2022 song featuring Jungkook
 "Left, Right", by YG, 2013
"Left, Right", by The Chemical Brothers from Push the Button, 2005
”Left, Right”, by Lil Tecca from We Love You Tecca, 2019
"Left, Right", by Inna from Hot, 2009
 Left and Right: A Journal of Libertarian Thought, a 1965 libertarian journal
In Love We Trust, also known as Left Right, a Chinese film
Left/Right, an American TV production company controlled by Red Arrow Entertainment Group

See also 
 Sinistral and dextral, the two types of chirality ("handedness") or relative direction in some scientific fields
 Dexter and sinister, the Latin names of left and right, used in science and heraldry
 Left Right and Centre, a comedy film
 Left Right Left (disambiguation)